"Discoteque" is a song by Lithuanian pop-rock band the Roop. The song represented Lithuania in the Eurovision Song Contest 2021 in Rotterdam, the Netherlands, after winning the pre-selection competition Pabandom iš Naujo! 2021.

At Eurovision 

The 65th edition of the Eurovision Song Contest took place in Rotterdam, the Netherlands and consisted of two semi-finals on 18 May and 20 May 2021, and the grand final on 22 May 2021. On 17 November 2020, it was announced that Lithuania would be performing in the first half of the first semi-final of the contest. On 18 May, after competing in the first semi-final, Lithuania was announced as having qualified for the final round, receiving 203 points, garnering them the 4th place in the ranking of the semifinal.

Lithuania's "Discoteque" received 220 points and finished 8th in the competition, the best result of the country since 2006.

Personnel 
Credits adapted from Tidal.

 Laisvūnas Černovas – producer, keyboards, masterer, mixer, writer
 Vaidotas Valiukevičius – producer, keyboards, mixer, vocals, writer
 Robertas Baranauskas – bass, keyboards, writer
 Mantas Banišauskas – guitar, writer
 The Roop – vocals
 Ilkka Wirtanen – writer
 Kalle Lindroth – writer

Charts

Release history

References 

2021 singles
2021 songs
Eurovision songs of 2021
Eurovision songs of Lithuania
The Roop songs
Warner Music Group singles